Monroe Township is one of the 25 townships of Licking County, Ohio, United States. As of the 2010 census, the total population was 6,946, up from 5,523 at the 2000 census. As of 2010, the population in the unincorporated part of the township was 2,314.

Geography
Located on the western edge of the county, it borders the following townships:
Hartford Township - north
Bennington Township - northeast corner
Liberty Township - east
St. Albans Township - southeast corner
Jersey Township - south
Plain Township, Franklin County - southwest corner
Harlem Township, Delaware County - west
Trenton Township, Delaware County - northwest corner

The village of Johnstown is located in eastern Monroe Township.

Name and history
It is one of 22 Monroe Townships statewide.

Government
The township is governed by a three-member board of trustees, who are elected in November of odd-numbered years to a four-year term beginning on the following January 1. Two are elected in the year after the presidential election and one is elected in the year before it. There is also an elected township fiscal officer, who serves a four-year term beginning on April 1 of the year after the election, which is held in November of the year before the presidential election. Vacancies in the fiscal officership or on the board of trustees are filled by the remaining trustees.

References

External links

County website

Townships in Licking County, Ohio
Townships in Ohio